Nathaniel Mayer Victor Rothschild, 3rd Baron Rothschild  (31 October 1910 – 20 March 1990) was a British banker, scientist, intelligence officer during World War II, and later a senior executive with Royal Dutch Shell and N M Rothschild & Sons, and an advisor to the Edward Heath and Margaret Thatcher governments of the UK.  He was a member of the prominent Rothschild family.

Biography

Early life 
Rothschild was the only son of Charles Rothschild and Rózsika Rothschild (née Baroness Edle von Wertheimstein). Both parents were Jewish, his father a member of the Rothschild banking family and his mother the daughter of the first titled Jew in Austria. He grew up in Waddesdon Manor and Tring Park Mansion, among other family homes. He had three sisters, including Pannonica de Koenigswarter (who would become known as the "Jazz Baroness") and Dame Miriam Louisa Rothschild. Rothschild suffered the suicide of his father when he was 13 years old. He was educated at Harrow School.

Cambridge and London 
At Trinity College, Cambridge, he read physiology, French, and English. Later he worked in the Zoology Department before gaining a PhD in 1935. He played first-class cricket for the University and Northamptonshire. At Cambridge he was known for his playboy lifestyle, driving a Bugatti and collecting art and rare books.

Rothschild joined the Cambridge Apostles, a secret society, which at that time was predominantly Marxist, though he stated himself that he "was mildly left-wing but never a Marxist". He became friends with Guy Burgess, Anthony Blunt and Kim Philby; members of the Cambridge Spy Ring.

In 1933, Rothschild gave Blunt £100 to purchase "Eliezer and Rebecca" by Nicolas Poussin. The painting was sold by Blunt's executors in 1985 for £100,000 and is now in the Fitzwilliam Museum.

His flat in London was shared with Burgess and Blunt. This later aroused suspicion that he was the so-called Fifth Man in the Cambridge Spy Ring.

Rothschild inherited his title at the age of 26 following the death of his uncle Walter Rothschild, 2nd Baron Rothschild on 27 August 1937. He sat as a Labour Party peer in the House of Lords, but spoke only twice there during his life (both speeches were in 1946, one about the pasteurization of milk, and another about the situation in Palestine).

World War II
Rothschild was recruited to work for MI5 during World War II in roles including bomb disposal, disinformation and espionage, winning the George Medal for "dangerous work in hazardous circumstances". He was the head of B1C, the "explosives and sabotage section", and worked on identifying where Britain's war effort was vulnerable to sabotage and counter German sabotage attempts. This included personally dismantling examples of German booby traps and disguised explosives.

With his assistant Theresa Clay, he ran the "Fifth Column" operation, that saw MI5 officer Eric Roberts masquerade as the Gestapo's man in London in order to identify hundreds of Nazi sympathizers.

Cold War, Shell and Think Tank
In Who Paid the Piper? (1999), an account of CIA propaganda during the Cold War, author Frances Stonor Saunders alleges that Rothschild channelled funds to Encounter, an intellectual magazine founded in 1953 to support the "non-Stalinist left" to advance US foreign policy goals.

After the war, he joined the zoology department at Cambridge University from 1950 to 1970. He served as chairman of the Agricultural Research Council from 1948 to 1958 and as worldwide head of research at Royal Dutch/Shell from 1963 to 1970.

Flora Solomon claims in her autobiography that in August 1962, during a reception at the Weizmann Institute, she told Rothschild that she thought that Tomás Harris and Kim Philby were Soviet spies.

When Anthony Blunt was unmasked as a member of the Cambridge Spy ring in 1964, Rothschild was questioned by Special Branch (though Blunt was not publicly identified as a Soviet agent until 1979 in the House of Commons by Prime Minister Margaret Thatcher). Rothschild was cleared, and continued working on projects for the British government.

Rothschild was head of the Central Policy Review Staff from 1971 to 1974 (known popularly as "The Think Tank") a staff which researched policy specifically for the Government until Margaret Thatcher abolished it.

In 1971 Rothschild was awarded an honorary degree from Tel Aviv University for ''the advancement of science, education and the economy of Israel''. It was followed in 1975 by an honorary degree from Jerusalem's Hebrew University. The annual "Victor Rothschild Memorial Symposia" is named after Rothschild.

Thatcher years and Spycatcher 
In the 1980s, Rothschild joined the family bank as chairman in an effort to quell the feuding between factions led by Evelyn Rothschild and Victor's son, Jacob Rothschild. In this he was unsuccessful as Jacob resigned from the bank to found J. Rothschild Assurance Group (a separate entity, now St. James's Place plc).

In 1982 he published An Enquiry into the Social Science Research Council at the behest of Sir Keith Joseph, a Conservative minister and mentor of Margaret Thatcher.

He continued to work in security as an adviser to Margaret Thatcher.

He appears several times in the book Spycatcher, which he hoped would clear the air over suspicions about his wartime role and the possibility he was involved in the Cambridge spy ring.  In early 1987 Tam Dalyell MP used parliamentary privilege to suggest Rothschild should be prosecuted for a chain of events he had "set in train, with Peter Wright and Harry Chapman Pincher" which had led to a "breach of confidence in relation to information on matters of state security given to authors".

He was still able to enter the premises of MI5 as a former employee and was aware of suspicions there was a "mole" in MI5, but felt himself above suspicion. While Edward Heath was Prime Minister, Rothschild was a frequent visitor to Chequers, the Prime Minister's country residence. Throughout Rothschild's life, he was a valued adviser on intelligence and science to both Conservative and Labour Governments.

In his 1994 book The Fifth Man, Australian author Roland Perry asserted that in 1993, after the dissolution of the Soviet Union, six retired KGB colonels, including Yuri Modin, the spy ring's handler, alleged Rothschild was the so-called "Fifth Man": "Rothschild was the key to most of the Cambridge ring's penetration of British intelligence. "He had the contacts", Modin noted. "He was able to introduce Burgess, Blunt and others to important figures in Intelligence such as Stewart Menzies, Dick White and Robert Vansittart in the Foreign Office ... who controlled MI6." However this suggestion is rebutted by other researchers; commentator Sheila Kerr pointed out that as soon as the book came out, Modin denied Perry's version of their discussions (having already stated that the fifth man was Cairncross), and concluded that "Perry's case against Rothschild is unconvincing because of dubious sources and slack methods". Noel Annan, who was criticised by the author Perry for a negative view of the latter's book and claims, writes: "Amid clouds of misstatements he [Perry] relies almost wholly on insinuation and bluster. ... when Andrew Boyle published his book and exposed Blunt, why did Margaret Thatcher acknowledge in the House of Commons the truth about Blunt, but later, in the case of Rothschild, clear him? Mr. Perry is saying she lied to the House. He tries to make much of her curt statement, "I am advised that we have no evidence that he was ever a Soviet spy." It is the only official reply she could have made. In MI5 jargon there was "No Trace" against his name". Christopher Andrew and Vasili Mitrokhin, in The Mitrokhin Archives, make no mention of Rothschild as a Soviet agent and instead identify John Cairncross as the Fifth Man.

Former KGB controller Yuri Modin denied ever having named Rothschild as "any kind of Soviet agent". "Because he was in MI5 they learned things from him. This doesn't make him the fifth man, and he wasn't," Modin wrote. His own book's title clarifies the name of all five of the Cambridge spy group: My Five Cambridge Friends: Burgess, Maclean, Philby, Blunt, and Cairncross by Their KGB Controller. Since Rothschild had died prior to publication of the Perry book, the family was unable to start a libel action.

Rothschild published two volumes of memoirs, Meditations of a Broomstick (1977) and Random Variables (1984).

Despite being an opposition Labour party peer, in 1987, during the Thatcher Government, Victor played a role in the sacking of Director-General of the BBC Alasdair Milne, who had backed the programmes Secret Society, Real Lives, and Panorama: 'Maggie's Militant Tendency' which had angered the Thatcher government. Marmaduke Hussey, who was Chairman of the BBC Board of Governors at the time, implied Rothschild initiated the Milne sacking in his autobiography Chance Governs All.

Rothschild took the step of publishing a letter in British newspapers on 3 December 1986 to state "I am not, and never have been, a Soviet agent".

He was an advisor to William Waldegrave during the design of the Community Charge, which led to the Poll Tax Riots.

Family
In 1933, he married Barbara Judith Hutchinson (1911-1989).  They had three children.
Sarah Rothschild (born 1934)
Nathaniel Charles Jacob Rothschild (born 1936) (later Jacob Rothschild) 4th Baron Rothschild
Miranda Rothschild (born 1940)

In 1946, he married Teresa Georgina Mayor (1915–1996), who had worked as his assistant at MI5. Mayor's maternal grandfather was Robert John Grote Mayor, the brother of English novelist F. M. Mayor and a greatnephew of philosopher and clergyman John Grote. Her maternal grandmother, Katherine Beatrice Meinertzhagen, was the sister of soldier Richard Meinertzhagen and the niece of author Beatrice Webb. They had four children:
Emma Georgina Rothschild (born 1948), married the Bengali Hindu economist Amartya Kumar Sen (b. 1933) in 1991.
Benjamin Mayer Rothschild (born and died 1952).
Victoria Katherine Rothschild (born 1953) is an academic lecturer at Queen Mary, University of London and the second wife and widow of English writer Simon Gray (1936–2008).
Amschel Mayor James Rothschild (1955–1996), married to Anita Patience Guinness of the Anglo-Irish Protestant Guinness family. Amschel committed suicide in 1996. They had three children; Kate Emma Rothschild Goldsmith (b. 1982), Alice Miranda Rothschild (b. 1983) and James Amschel Victor Rothschild (b. 1985)

Born into a nominally Jewish family, in adult life Rothschild declared himself to be an atheist. However, his body was interred in the historic Jewish Brady Street Cemetery, which remarkably saved that cemetery from proposed redevelopment for 100 years. His sister Miriam Louisa Rothschild was a distinguished entomologist, and his sister Nica de Koenigswarter was a bebop jazz enthusiast and patron of Thelonious Monk and Charlie Parker.

Honours and awards

Titles
 3rd Baron Rothschild, of Tring, co. Hertford [U.K., 1885], 27 August 1937.
 4th Baronet Rothschild [U.K., 1847], 27 August 1937.
 Knight Grand Cross, Order of the British Empire (G.B.E.), 1975.
 Knight, Most Venerable Order of the Hospital of St. John of Jerusalem (K.St.J.).
 Fellow, Royal Society (F.R.S.), 1953.
 Major, Intelligence Corps.

Decorations
 George Medal (G.M.) (United Kingdom), 1944.
 Legion of Merit (United States), 1946.
 Bronze Star Medal (United States), 1948.

Notes

References

 See also the list of references at Rothschild banking family of England

External links

1910 births
1990 deaths
3
Labour Party (UK) hereditary peers
MI5 personnel
Cambridge University cricketers
English cricketers
English Jews
English atheists
Jewish American atheists
Jewish scientists
Jewish British politicians
Northamptonshire cricketers
People educated at Harrow School
Fellows of the Royal Society
Knights Grand Cross of the Order of the British Empire
Recipients of the George Medal
Alumni of Trinity College, Cambridge
20th-century British zoologists
Burials at Brady Street Cemetery